William S. Penn (born 1949) is a writer and English professor at Michigan State University.

Life
William S. Penn is an urban mixed-blood Nez Perce. Born and raised in the West, he has lived in many different regions of the United States, as well as in England. He was educated at the University of California at Davis and at Syracuse University. He previously taught at the State University of New York at Oswego and at Hostos Community College in the South Bronx. He teaches courses in the oral tradition, comedy and cultural survival, the literatures of the Americas, and creative writing.

Penn uses his writing to explore and reconcile his mixed ethnic heritage, writing fiction, essays and reviews. His works have been included in Antaeus, Missouri Review, Quarterly West, Stand, and Southern Humanities Review, Guest Editor for Callaloo.

He lives in East Lansing with his wife, Jennifer, and their two children, Rachel Antonia and William Anthony. He is working on a new novel-in-five-essays titled, The Death of Consuela.

"I write to amuse and entertain, but I write from a center I take seriously, a center given to me by my grandfather, encouraged by my sisters, and nurtured by my wife and by my daughter and son with whom I tell stories. Indeed, All My Sins Are Relatives is dedicated 'For Grandfather, who knows / And Rachel and Willy, so they may.' Thus, I would say that much of my work is so they—the children, not just my own—may know my attempt to bridge the gap between the urban mixblood and Euramerican worlds to which I belong."

He currently teaches fiction and non-fiction writing at Michigan State University. Penn drew controversy criticizing Republicans in a literature, cultures, and humanities class in 2013, saying Republicans "raped" America.

Awards
Penn was awarded the Stephen Crane Prize for Fiction twice. He received a Yaddo Fellowship to the Yaddo Writer's Colony to work on his novel, The Absence of Angels. He also received a supporting grant from the Ludwig Vogelstein Foundation, Inc. in 1985, an All University Research Initiation Grant from Michigan State University, a New York Foundation for the Arts Prize in 1988, and a Michigan Council on the Arts Grant in 1990 to help in completing this book.

In 1991, Penn was a Resident Writer at the Banff Center for the Arts. He received the North American Indian Prose Award from the University of Nebraska Press in 1994 for All My Sins Are Relatives and an All University Research Completion Grant from Michigan State University to complete the work. In 1996, All My Sins Are Relatives received the Critic's Choice Award for the Most Acclaimed Books of 1995-96.

Penn was named Native American Writer of the Year in Non-fiction by the Wordcraft Circle of Native Writers and Storytellers in 1997. In 1998, he was named Native American Editor of the Year by the same organization. His book The Telling of the World: Native American Stories and Art was named to the list of Best University Press Books of 2000. He has also received the American Book Award for Literary Merit and the Distinguished Faculty Award from Michigan State University.

He was named a 2002 Wordcraft Circle Writer of the Year in Creative Prose: Fiction for Feathering Custer.

Books

Fiction
The Absence of Angels, Univ. Oklahoma Press.
Killing Time with Strangers, Univ. Arizona Press.
This is the World, Michigan State Univ. Press.
The Telling of the World: Native American Stories and Art, as Editor, Stewart Tabori & Chang.

Essays
All My Sins Are Relatives, Univ. Nebraska Press.
As We Are Now: Mixblood Essays on Race and Identity, as Editor and contributor, Univ. California Press.
Feathering Custer, Univ. Nebraska Press.

Anthologies
I Tell You Now, Brian Swann (Editor), Univ. Nebraska Press.
The New Short Story Theories, Charles E. May (Editor), Ohio Univ. Press.

References  

1949 births
Living people
Native American writers
Michigan State University faculty
American Book Award winners
University of California, Davis alumni
Hostos Community College faculty